Tugela Fairy (Made of Stars) is the second studio album by South African singer and songwriter Simmy, released on November 6, 2020, through EL World Music and Sony.

The album debuted number 3 in South Africa.

Background 
In October 2020, Simmy  announced  her album via Instagram account.

Music and lyrics 

The standard edition Tugela Fairy (Made Of Stars) is about one hour, twelve minutes, and 29 seconds long, consisting of 16 tracks.

Composition 
Critics categorize Tugela Fairy (Made of Stars) as a Neo Soul, Afro House, and Afro-Pop. It also incorporates Maskandi, Mbaqanga, Kwaito, and  Old house elements.

Themes 
Tugela Fairy (Made of Stars) lyrically is the continuation of her debut album Tugela Fairy,
it describe musical journey and tells her story of strength and woman empowerment.

Critical reception 
John Israel A of Ubetoo said "the album is a compilation worth the wait and a splendid advertisement of Simmy’s musical growth" and rated the album 4.5/5.

Year-end lists

Commercial performance 
Upon its release the album debuted number 3 in South Africa.

Track listing

Accolades 
The album was nominated for Best Afro pop Album at the 27th ceremony of South African Music Awards.

|-
|rowspan="2"|2021
|rowspan="2"| Tugela Fairy  (Made of Stars)
| Best Afro Pop Album 
| 
|-
| Best Produced Album of the Year 
|

Certifications and sales

Releases 
"Emakhaya" was released on October 16, 2020, featuring South African DJ's Sun-El Musician and Da Capo as album's second single.

Release history

References 

2020 albums
EL World Music albums